The Kia KX3 is a subcompact crossover SUV manufactured exclusively for the Chinese market by Dongfeng Yueda Kia. Since 2019, it is known as the KX3 Aopao.



First generation (KC; 2015) 

The KX3 debuted as a concept on the 2014 Guangzhou Auto Show, while the production version made its debut in March 2015.

The KX3 is based on the platform of the Hyundai ix25 and has engine options including a 1.6 liter inline-4 engine with 123hp and 151nm, a 1.6 liter inline-4 turbo engine with 200hp and 264nm, and a 2.0 liter inline-4 engine with 202hp and 192nm. All 1.6 liter engine models are front-wheel-drive with only the 2.0 liter engine models offering optional all-wheel-drive. Transmission options are 6-speed manual gearbox or 6-speed automatic gearbox for the non-turbo models and a 7-speed DCT for the 1.6 liter turbo engine model. Pricing for the Kia KX3 Ao Pao ranges from 112,800 yuan to 186,800 yuan ($18,018 – 29,830). The facelifted Kia KX3 was launched on the 2016 Chengdu Auto Show in China with updates to the front and rear bumper designs.

KX3 EV
The Kia KX3 EV was launched in China in 2018 with prices starting at 239,800.00 ¥ before incentives. The KX3 EV was produced by Dongfeng Yueda Kia, and the drivetrain produces 81 kW (109 hp) power, and 285 N.m/ 210 lb.ft of torque. The top speed of the 2018 Yueda Kia KX3 EV is 150 km/h / 94 mph, with the NEDC energy consumption being 16.4 kWh/100km.

Second generation (SP2c; 2020)

In September 2019, Dongfeng Yueda Kia unveiled the Seltos as the second generation KX3 with an additional Chinese name, Aopao (傲跑). The second generation KX3 was available in the Chinese market in December 2019. In terms of power, the second generation KX3 is equipped with the G4FL 1.5-liter naturally aspirated engine producing 115 hp.

References

External links

 (first generation)
 (second generation)

2010s cars
Cars introduced in 2015
Cars of China
Crossover sport utility vehicles
KX3
Mini sport utility vehicles
Production electric cars